The FIA WTCC Race of Austria was a round of the World Touring Car Championship that took place in Austria. It was first included on the calendar in 2012, when it was held at the Salzburgring. It was held at the venue three times.

Austria was left off the calendar for the 2015 World Touring Car Championship season as the series returns to neighbouring Germany.

Winners

References

Austria
World Touring Car Championship
Recurring sporting events established in 2012
Recurring sporting events disestablished in 2014
2012 establishments in Austria
2014 disestablishments in Austria